Macrocheilus binotatus is a species of ground beetle in the subfamily Anthiinae. It was described by Andrewes in 1931.

References

Anthiinae (beetle)
Beetles described in 1931